The 2014 Open Championship was a men's major golf championship and the 143rd Open Championship, held from 17 to 20 July at Royal Liverpool Golf Club in Merseyside, England.

Rory McIlroy won his first Open Championship, two strokes ahead of runners-up Rickie Fowler and Sergio García, and became only the sixth to win the championship going wire-to-wire after 72 holes (being the sole leader after each round). It was McIlroy's third major title, having won the U.S. Open in 2011 and the PGA Championship in 2012; he became the first European to win three different majors and joined Jack Nicklaus and Tiger Woods as the only three (since the first Masters Tournament in 1934) to win three majors by the age of 25.

Venue

The 2014 event was the twelfth Open Championship played at Royal Liverpool Golf Club. The most recent was in 2006, with Tiger Woods winning his second consecutive Open Championship title, holding off Chris DiMarco with a two-shot victory. The first open at the venue was in 1897, won by amateur Harold Hilton by a stroke ahead of James Braid.

Lengths of the course for previous Opens (since 1947):
 2006: , par 72
 1967: , par 72
 1956: , par 71
 1947: , par 68

Field
Each player is classified according to the first category in which he qualified, but other categories are shown in parentheses.

1. The Open Champions aged 60 or under on 20 July 2014
Stewart Cink (2,3), Darren Clarke (2,3), Ben Curtis, John Daly, David Duval, Ernie Els (2,3,6,15), Nick Faldo, Todd Hamilton (2), Pádraig Harrington (2), Paul Lawrie, Justin Leonard (3), Sandy Lyle, Phil Mickelson (2,3,4,5,10,13,15), Louis Oosthuizen (2,3,5,15), Tiger Woods (2,3,4,5,12,13,15)
 Eligible but did not enter: Ian Baker-Finch, Greg Norman, Nick Price
 Tom Lehman withdrew for family reasons.
 Mark O'Meara withdrew with an elbow injury.
 Mark Calcavecchia (3) withdrew.

2. The Open Champions for 2004–2013

3. The Open Champions finishing in the first 10 and tying for 10th place in The Open Championship 2009–2013
Tom Watson

4. First 10 and anyone tying for 10th place in the 2013 Open Championship
Zach Johnson (5,13,15), Hunter Mahan (5,13,15), Hideki Matsuyama (5,15,20), Francesco Molinari (5,6), Ian Poulter (5,6), Adam Scott (5,10,13,15,17), Henrik Stenson (5,6,13), Lee Westwood (5,6)

5. The first 50 players on the Official World Golf Ranking (OWGR) for Week 21, 2014
Thomas Bjørn (6), Jonas Blixt, Keegan Bradley (11,13,15), Jason Day (13,15), Graham DeLaet (13,15), Luke Donald (7,13), Jamie Donaldson (6), Victor Dubuisson (6), Jason Dufner (11,13,15), Harris English, Matt Every, Rickie Fowler, Jim Furyk (13), Stephen Gallacher (6), Sergio García (6,13), Bill Haas (13,15), Russell Henley, Miguel Ángel Jiménez (6), Dustin Johnson (13), Matt Jones, Martin Kaymer (6,9,11,12), Chris Kirk, Matt Kuchar (12,13,15), Joost Luiten (6), Graeme McDowell (6,9), Rory McIlroy (7,9,11), Ryan Moore, Ryan Palmer, Patrick Reed, Justin Rose (6,9,13), Charl Schwartzel (6,10,13,15), John Senden (Open Qualifying Series – Australia), Webb Simpson (9,13,15), Brandt Snedeker (13,15), Jordan Spieth (13,15), Jimmy Walker, Bubba Watson (10), Gary Woodland (13)
 Steve Stricker (13,15) chose not to play.

6. First 30 in the Race to Dubai for 2013
Grégory Bourdy, Paul Casey, Gonzalo Fernández-Castaño, Tommy Fleetwood, Branden Grace (15), David Howell, Mikko Ilonen, Thongchai Jaidee, Matteo Manassero (7), Brett Rumford, Richard Sterne (15), Peter Uihlein, Bernd Wiesberger, Chris Wood

7. The BMW PGA Championship winners for 2012–2014

8. First 5 European Tour members and any European Tour members tying for 5th place, not otherwise exempt, in the top 20 of the Race to Dubai on completion of the 2014 BMW International Open
Rafa Cabrera-Bello, Pablo Larrazábal, Shane Lowry

9. The U.S. Open Champions for 2010–2014

10. The Masters Tournament Champions for 2010–2014

11. The PGA Champions for 2009–2013
Yang Yong-eun

12. The Players Champions for 2012–2014

13. The leading 30 qualifiers for the 2013 Tour Championship
Roberto Castro, Brendon de Jonge (15), Billy Horschel, D. A. Points, Kevin Streelman, Nick Watney, Boo Weekley14. First 5 PGA Tour members and any PGA Tour members tying for 5th place, not exempt in the top 20 of the PGA Tour FedEx Cup points list for 2014 on completion of the 2014 Travelers ChampionshipKevin Na, Brendon Todd15. Playing members of the 2013 Presidents Cup teamsÁngel Cabrera, Marc Leishman16. First and anyone tying for 1st place on the Order of Merit of the Asian Tour for 2013Kiradech Aphibarnrat17. First and anyone tying for 1st place on the Order of Merit of the PGA Tour of Australasia for 201318. First and anyone tying for 1st place on the Order of Merit of the Southern Africa PGA Sunshine Tour for 2013 
Dawie van der Walt19. The Japan Open Champion for 2013Masanori Kobayashi20. First 2 and anyone tying for 2nd place, not exempt, on the Official Money List of the Japan Golf Tour for 2013Kim Hyung-sung21. First 2 and anyone tying for 2nd place, in a cumulative money list taken from all official 2014 Japan Golf Tour events up to and including the 2014 Japan Golf Tour Championship.Yūsaku Miyazato, Koumei Oda22. The Senior Open Champion for 2013Mark Wiebe23. The Amateur Champion for 2014Bradley Neil (a)24. The U.S. Amateur Champion for 2013 Matt Fitzpatrick (26) forfeited his exemption by turning professional after the U.S. Open.25. The European Amateur Champion for 2013Ashley Chesters (a)26. The Mark H. McCormack Medal winner for 2013Open Qualifying SeriesMajor changes were made to the qualification categories. There is now an Open Qualifying Series (OQS) which consists of 10 events from the six major tours. This series largely replaces International Final Qualifying. Places are available to the leading players (not otherwise exempt) who finish in the top n and ties. In the event of ties, positions go to players highest according to that week's OWGR.Final QualifyingUnlike in previous years, the Final Qualifying events were played at four courses covering Scotland and the North-West, Central and South-coast regions of England and not at four courses near the Open Championship venue.Gailes Links: – Paul McKechnie, Jamie McLeary, Marc WarrenHillside: – Oscar Florén, Chris Hanson, John SingletonSunningdale: – An Byeong-hun, Chris Rodgers, Matthew SouthgateWoburn: – Paul Dunne (a), Rhys Enoch, Oliver Fisher

McKechnie and Singleton had earlier played in Regional Qualifying, at Bruntsfield Links and Mere, respectively.Alternates'To make up the full field of 156, additional places were allocated in ranking order from the Official World Golf Ranking at the time that these places were made available by the Championship Committee. Any places made available after the week 27 rankings issued on 6 July 2014 used these week 27 rankings. Ten places were made available on 2 July and so ten players were added based on the week 26 rankings.

 Kevin Stadler (ranked 62, week 26)
 J. B. Holmes (63)
 K. J. Choi (66)
 Erik Compton (72)
 Charles Howell III (73) –  withdrew for family reasons Brooks Koepka (74)
 Chesson Hadley (76)
 Freddie Jacobson (79)
 Anirban Lahiri (81)
 Scott Stallings (82)
 Thorbjørn Olesen (84) – replaced Charles Howell III
 Ryo Ishikawa (ranked 76, week 27) – replaced Steve Stricker
 Ross Fisher (90) – replaced Mark O'Meara
 David Hearn (94) – replaced Mark Calcavecchia

 (a) denotes amateurRound summaries

First roundThursday, 17 July 2014Rory McIlroy shot a bogey-free round of 66 (−6) to take a one-stroke lead over Matteo Manassero. World number one Adam Scott, Sergio García, brothers Edoardo and Francesco Molinari, Shane Lowry, Brooks Koepka and Jim Furyk were another shot further back at 68 (−4). Three-time champion Tiger Woods, playing in his first major championship of the year following back surgery, rebounded from bogeys on his first two holes to post a round of 69 (−3).

Second roundFriday, 18 July 2014Rory McIlroy shot a second consecutive round of 66 (−6) to post a 132 total (−12) and a four-shot lead after 36 holes. Dustin Johnson had the lowest round of the tournament with a 65 (−7) to move into second place.

Amateurs: Chesters (+3), Dunne (+4), Pan (+4), Neil (+11).

Third roundSaturday, 19 July 2014In anticipation of an approaching severe storm with lightning Saturday afternoon, the R&A announced Friday that the third round would be played off both the 1st and 10th tees in threesomes. Normal play is from only the first tee in pairs. This was the first time that play went off both tees at The Open.

Rickie Fowler, beginning the round six shots behind leader Rory McIlroy, recorded birdies on 7 of his first 12 holes to pull into a tie for the lead at 12-under. Still tied, Fowler made bogey on the 14th, while McIlroy made a  putt for birdie and a two-shot swing which gave him the lead again. At the par-5 16th, Fowler made another bogey to drop into a tie for second with playing partner Sergio García. McIlroy then eagled the hole to take a 5-shot lead after the three-shot swing with Fowler. All three players bogeyed the 17th. McIlroy was the only person to eagle the 16th and 18th holes in the third round. Going into the closing round, McIlroy was within three shots of both the Open scoring record to par and the record score to par for all major championships, both of which are −19. The severe storms expected never materialized, although heavy showers preceded and followed third round play.

Final roundSunday, 20 July 2014Sergio García applied pressure on the leader Rory McIlroy early, making birdie at three of the first five holes.  McIlroy responded with a birdie at the 1st hole, while playing partner Rickie Fowler missed a number of early opportunities for birdie.  McIlroy made bogey at both the 5th and the 6th to drop his lead to 3 shots, and came back with a birdie at the 9th. García made an eagle at the 10th, besting McIlroy and Fowler who both made birdie. McIlroy made bogey at 13 to fall to −16 and his lead fell to two shots over García. However, García missed the green at the 15th in a greenside bunker and failed to escape the bunker on his first attempt. He made bogey and dropped into a tie with Fowler at −13. All three players made birdie at 16, and McIlroy missed the green at the 17th. His chip shot rolled to within a foot from the cup, securing par. Fowler and García both made birdie at the 18th. McIlroy made par for a two-shot victory. Jim Furyk finished fourth, as he did in 2006, also at Hoylake.

The low round of the day and the championship was 65 (−7), recorded by four players in placid conditions on Sunday.

Final leaderboard

Source:

ScorecardFinal roundCumulative tournament scores, relative to par''

Source:

Notes and references

External links
 Royal Liverpool 2014 (Official site)
 143rd Open Championship - Royal Liverpool (European Tour)
 2014 Open Championship (PGA of America)

The Open Championship
Golf tournaments in England
Sport in the Metropolitan Borough of Wirral
Open Championship
Open Championship
Open Championship